"Do You Think About Me" is a song recorded by Swedish singer Benjamin Ingrosso. The song was released as a digital download in Sweden on 5 May 2017, peaked at number 87 on the Swedish Singles Chart and was certified gold in Sweded in 2018.

Music video
A music video to accompany the release of "Do You Think About Me" was first released onto YouTube on 19 May 2017 at a total length of three minutes and thirteen seconds.

Track listing

Chart performance

Weekly charts

Certifications

Release history

References

2017 singles
2017 songs
English-language Swedish songs
Benjamin Ingrosso songs
Swedish pop songs
Songs written by Benjamin Ingrosso
Songs written by Marcus Sepehrmanesh